Bryan H. Carroll (born February 13, 1967) is an American director, producer, screenwriter and editor.
He is best known for his award winning documentary Why We Ride, his distinctions from the American Motorcyclist Association and contributions to Titanic, Public Enemies, Die Hard, Predator, Collateral, Miami Vice, Ali, Skid Row and The Phantom.

Early life
Bryan Carroll was born on February 13, 1967, in Bountiful, Utah, where he attended the University of California, Los Angeles Writers Program. His career began early in 1986, when at 19, he began working at CRC, a visual effects company in Hollywood that serviced studios and major production companies. In this company, he interacted extensively with editors and eventually worked his way into the cutting room.

Career
Carroll has worked in the roles of director, producer, writer and editor. He has collaborated with directors and producers like James Cameron, Michael Mann, Jerry Bruckheimer, Joel Silver. Carroll also created the Editexpress - the first mobile film editing trailer for location use on feature films.

Director or second unit director
He has directed or second unit directed several movies, including Why We Ride, Public Enemies, To Ride A Legend, Collateral and Robbery Homicide Division (Season 1).

Producer
He has been a producer, associate producer, co-producer, post production producer, executive producer or executive soundtrack producer of a number of movies including Why We Ride, Public Enemies, Living in the Age of Airplanes, To Ride A Legend, Skid Row, Miami Vice, Redline, Collateral and the TV show Robbery Homicide Division.

Screenwriter
His writing debut was the documentary film on the life of motorcyclists titled Why We Ride. This film has received recognition from critics, viewers and has won several awards.

Editor
He worked as an editor on movies and shows including Titanic, Major League III, The Phantom (1996 film), Free Willy, Accident (1993 TV-series), Tales From The Crypt and Last Chance.

Filmography

Awards and recognition
Carroll has been credited in inventing a lot of the workflow for digital photography in motion picture production along with Michael Mann. He has received the following awards and distinctions during his career:

Best Documentary 2014 - New Media Film Festival
Best Documentary 2014, Best Editing 2014, Best Cinematography 2014 - AutoMoto Film Festival  
Family Choice 2014 - Family Choice Awards 
Best Documentary 2014 - Los Angeles New Media Film Festival 
Best Documentary 2013 - Motorcycle Film Festival 
Hazel Kolb Brighter Image Award 2014, Motorcyclist of the Year 2014 - American Motorcyclist Association
2014 AMA Motorcyclist of the year award from the American Motorcyclist Association
Best Documentary 2014 - Portland Motorcycle Film Festival

References

1967 births
Film producers from California
American male screenwriters
Television producers from California
Living people
Writers from Los Angeles
People from Bountiful, Utah
University of California, Los Angeles alumni
Film directors from Los Angeles
Film directors from Utah
Screenwriters from California
Screenwriters from Utah